Barely Legal Drivers is a BBC series which follows teenagers' driving habits and style, unaware to the teenagers the parents are watching each journey and they are being assessed by a former traffic officer. At the end of the week, depending on the style of driving, the teenagers either win a free car or an advanced driving course. The series is narrated by Stephen Mangan.

Concept
The teenagers are led to believe that they are filming a slice of modern teenage life, but in reality they are being judged on their driving. Each participant takes three trips; each trip will be watched by their parents, an ex-traffic officer Judith Roberts and driving instructor John Lepine MBE (Series 2 only). After each participant has completed three trips ex-traffic officer Judith Roberts will make a decision based on their driving, if they have shown they are a safe driver they will be given the cash for a car, but if they have shown they are a dangerous driver they will be given advanced driving lessons.

Episodes

Series 1 (2013)

Series 2 (2014)

Controversy

Following the broadcast of series 1 the police have begun investigating the show  because of the shocking driving offences committed by teenage motorists on the programme. More than 300 viewers complained about the behaviour shown and police looked into whether the participants should be prosecuted for their bad driving. Many complained that the teenagers were rewarded with a free car despite the sloppy driving.

References

External links
 

BBC Television shows
Television shows set in the United Kingdom
2010s British reality television series
2013 British television series debuts
2014 British television series endings
BBC high definition shows
English-language television shows